F.C. Tzeirei Kafr Kanna is an Israeli football club based in Kafr Kanna. The club is currently in Liga Alef North division.

History
The club was founded in the summer of 2014, after Maccabi Kafr Kanna, which in its prime played in the second tier of Israeli football, dissolved following relegation from Liga Alef to Liga Bet in the previous season and due to deep debts. However, according to the club founder, Tarik Abbas, there is no relation between the clubs.

The club finished their first season on top of Liga Gimel Lower Galilee division and won promotion to Liga Bet. In the following season, the club finished on top of Liga Bet North A division and made their second successive promotion within two seasons, this time to Liga Alef, the third tier of Israeli football.

Honours

League

References

External links
Moadon Sport Tzeirei Kafr Kanna The Israel Football Association 

Kafr Kanna
Association football clubs established in 2014
2014 establishments in Israel
Kafr Kanna
Arab-Israeli football clubs